Shawa'at is a sub-district located in Dhi al-Sufal District, Ibb Governorate, Yemen. Shawa'at had a population of 4,834 as of 2004.

References 

Sub-districts in Dhi As Sufal District